The Irisbus Midys is a midibus made by Iveco Bus.

References

Midibuses
Iveco buses